Jonas Auer (born 5 August 2000 in Austria) is an Austrian footballer who now plays for SK Rapid Wien.

Career
Auer started his senior career with SKN St. Pölten. After that, he played for SK Slavia Prague and FK Viktoria Žižkov. In 2019, he signed for FK Mladá Boleslav in the Czech First League, where he has made ten appearances and scored zero goals.

Career statistics

Club

International

Notes

References

External links
 ÖFB talent Jonas Auer: Why the Czech Republic?
 Auer dribbles into the spotlight

2000 births
Living people
Austrian footballers
FK Mladá Boleslav players
SK Slavia Prague players
FK Viktoria Žižkov players
Czech First League players
Czech National Football League players
SKN St. Pölten players
Expatriate footballers in the Czech Republic
Austrian expatriate sportspeople in the Czech Republic
Association football midfielders
SK Rapid Wien players